The University of Malawi (UNIMA) is a public university established in 1965 and until 4 May 2021, when the university underwent a delinking, was composed of four constituent colleges located in Zomba, Blantyre, and Lilongwe. Of the four colleges, the largest is Chancellor College in Zomba (now the University of Malawi under Vice-Chancellor Professor Samson Sajidu). It is part of the Malawian government educational system. The last Vice-Chancellor was Professor John Kalenga Saka. UNIMA celebrated its golden jubilee from the 24 to the 26 September 2015.

Vision

The vision of the University of Malawi is to provide "relevant, world-class education, research and services for the sustainable development of Malawi and the world."

Significance
The university is the centre of knowledge, development of skills values, ideas and attitudes for engaging developmental challenges in the country.

History
The University of Malawi was founded a few months after Malawi Independence. The first enrollment consisted of 90 students in Blantyre. Teaching began in 1965 in Blantyre, and within two years the Institute of Public Administration at Mpemba, the Soche Hill College of Education and the Polytechnic in Blantyre, and Bunda College in Lilongwe became colleges of the university. In 1973, all the constituents of the university apart from the polytechnic and Bunda College moved to Zomba and were merged into Chancellor College. In 1979, Kamuzu College of Nursing became a college of the university, and in 1991 the College of Medicine in Blantyre was formed as a further constituent college.

Student Movements for Multi-Party Rule (1992)
During the movement toward the multiparty rule, UNIMA students participated in a protest that was organized by themselves as a part of fighting for their educational freedom. In March 1992, when Catholic Bishops in Malawi issued a Lenten Pastoral Letter that criticized Banda and his government, students of the University of Malawi at Chancellor College and the Polytechnic joined in through protests and demonstrations in support of the letter. This forced the authorities to close the campuses.

Youth for Freedom and Democracy
Youth for Freedom and Democracy (YFD) is a student political pressure group on campus. They publish the "Weekly Political Update" that is circulated to students on campus. They have been critical of Malawi's governance, and of the Paladin Energy mining company. In mid-September, Malawian police arrested several members of the group. They also arrested 21-year-old Black Moses, president of the YFD and interrogated him. A week later, 25-year-old Robert Chasowa, a fourth-year engineering student at the Malawi Polytechnic was found dead. Police ruled this a suicide but critics believe that he was murdered.

Constituent colleges and academics

Current colleges

Chancellor College, based in Zomba
Chancellor College is the largest college of the constituent colleges of the University of Malawi. It is also known as 'Chanco'. The college has five faculties: Faculty of Humanities, Faculty of Science, Faculty of Law, Faculty of Social Science and Faculty of Education. Departments service each faculty as follows: 
Education: Curriculum and Teaching Studies and Educational Foundations

Humanities: African Languages and Linguistics, Classics, English, Fine and Performing Arts, French, Language and Communication Skills, Philosophy and Theology and Religious Studies.

Science: Biology, Chemistry, Computer Science, Geography and Earth Sciences, Home Economics, Physics, Mathematical Sciences.

Social Science: Economics, History, Psychology, Political and Administrative Studies and Sociology.

College of Medicine

The University of Malawi houses a medical school, the College of Medicine (COM), which trains Malawian doctors that work both in Malawi and internationally. Candidates to be considered for medical training either enter after a one-year premedical training following their MSCE or after completing two years of a science course at Chancellor College. Out of about 250 doctors that had graduated from the University of Malawi-College of Medicine between 1992 and 2005, 25 (10%) were reported to be registered with the UK General Medical Council which has contributed to a healthcare worker brain drain in Malawi.

The College of Medicine has seen tremendous advancement in its board of administrators and infrastructure ever since its introduction in 1992. The college now has Four undergraduate courses which include the five-year-long Bachelor of Medicine and Surgery (MBBS), and the four-year-long programs of Bachelor of Medical Laboratory Sciences (BMLS), Bachelor of Physiotherapy (Hon) and Bachelor of Pharmacy (Hon). All the undergraduate students need to undergo a one-year premedical program at the college or must have finished their A-levels at recommended schools or must have attended a two-year science course at recommended college in order to be eligible for the programs offered at the College of Medicine. In addition, the college has a long stating relationship with the University of St Andrews School of Medicine in Scotland. In 2011, 10 students from the University of St Andrews School of Medicine visited the college on exchange. Both schools run the Global Health Education Workshops/Module (GHEP) which seeks to provide a forum for discussion of pressing global health issues like climate change, overpopulation, epidemics and the concept of good aid.

Kamuzu College of Nursing, based in Lilongwe
Entry requirements for nursing and paramedical training institutions is the
Malawi School Certificate of Education (Ordinary Level). Nursing and midwifery training is for three years and is offered at the Malawi College of Health Sciences and any of the eight mission nursing schools scattered in mostly rural mission hospitals. The Kamuzu College of Nursing provides nursing degrees categorised as generic (degrees offered to students enrolled straight from secondary school), post-basic (degrees offered to enrolled nurses who have "acceptable" O-level grades and with at least two years of service) Bachelor of Science in Advanced Midwifery and Diploma in Nursing. Out of an estimated 4000 nurses active in Malawi in 2005, 453 who had been trained in Malawi were reported to be working in OECD countries (WHO, 2006). This represented 11.3% of the number of nurses active in the country.

The College of Medicine and Kamuzu College of Nursing delinked from the University of Malawi and combined to for the Kamuzu University of Health Sciences (KUHeS).

The Polytechnic, Blantyre Campus
The highest and most popular institution in Malawi offers various technical and vocational training based on national and regional needs.

Polytechnic has fifteen departments offering undergraduate degrees in accounting, business administration, management, civil(hons), mechanical(honors) and electrical engineering(hons), architecture and land management, environmental management, computing and information technology, journalism, language and communication, mathematics and statistics, physics and biochemical sciences, technical education and quantity surveying.

Polytechnic offers postgraduate programs in business administration, infrastructure development and transport management in response to the emerging needs of the industry and the pressure from the native baccalaureate graduates. After being delinked from the University of Malawi, The Polytechnic now operates as the Malawi University of Business and Applied Sciences (MUBAS).

Former colleges

Bunda College, Lilongwe
Bunda College of Agriculture offers BSc's, MSc's and PhD degrees in agriculture, Environmental Sciences and Development Studies. Its mission is to advance and promote knowledge,skills,self-reliance and sound character for "sustainable food production and utilization; Improving income, food security and nutrition; and Conservation and management of biodiversity, the environment and natural resources.
It is situated in Lilongwe 35.2  km from the capital city center. Nearby is the college farm serving commercial, practical, academic and research purposes.

Following the restructuring of universities in Malawi in 2012 by the then President Bingu wa Mutharika, Bunda college is no longer part of the University of Malawi. Now Bunda College forms part of Lilongwe University of Agriculture and Natural Resources (LUANAR). The university has three campus, i.e. Bunda campus, the City campus and the NRC campus.
Institute of Public Administration
Soche Hill College of Education
Malawi College of Accountancy

Enrollment
The University of Malawi had 6,257 full-time students in 2007. Of those, 6226 were Malawian citizens, 26 were from SADC countries and 5 were from other, non-SADC countries.

Vice-Chancellors of the university 
 Professor Samson Sajidu 2022–Present
 Professor John Saka 2013–2019
 Professor Emmanuel Fabiano 2010–2013
 Professor Zimani David Kadzamira 2005–2010
 Professor David Rubadiri 2000–2005
 Professor Brown Beswick Chimphamba 1992–2000
 Dr John Michael Dubbey 1987–1990
 Dr David Kimble 1977–1986
 Professor Gordon Hunnings 1973–1977
 Dr Ian Michael 1965–1973

Notable alumni
Lazarus McCarthy Chakwera, President of Malawi
Saulos Klaus Chilima, Vice President of Malawi
Cassim Chilumpha, Former Vice President of Malawi
Andrew KC Nyirenda, Retired Chief Justice of Malawi
Winford Masanjala, Associate Professor of Economics at University of Malawi, Secretary for Economic Planning and Development 
Caroline Alexander, author and journalist
Thomas John Bisika, Economist
Steve Chimombo, writer
Frank Chipasula, Author, Poet and Educator
Charles Chuka, Governor of the Reserve Bank of Malawi
Otria Moyo Jere, Cabinet Minister
Shemu Joyah, Film director
Ken Kandodo, Finance Minister
Paul Kishindo, Sociologist
Jane Kambalame, diplomat
Samson Kambalu, author
Lucious Grandson Kanyumba, Cabinet Minister
Ken Lipenga, Finance Minister
Jack Mapanje, Poet and Writer
Steve Dick Tennyson Matenje, UN Permanent Representative
Margaret Roka Mauwa, Cabinet Minister
Billy Abner Mayaya, human rights activist
Cuthy Mede, artist
Maxwell Mkwezalamba, African Union Commissioner
Chrissie Mughogho, diplomat
Samuel Mpasu, Speaker of the Malawi National Assembly
Cornelius Mwalwanda, Cabinet Minister
Hawa Ndilowe, diplomat
Angela Zachepa, Member of Parliament
Paul Tiyambe Zeleza, historian

See also
Lilongwe University of Agriculture and Natural Resources
Kwera

References

External links

Main site
 University of Malawi main home page

Department links
 Bunda College of Agriculture in Lilongwe
 Chancellor College in Zomba
 College of Medicine in Blantyre
 Kamuzu College of Nursing in Lilongwe
 Malawi Polytechnic in Blantyre

Other
 INHEA country profile: Malawi

 
University of Malawi
Educational institutions established in 1964
Medical schools in Malawi
Academic freedom